Lithium beryllide is a hypothetical intermetallic compound of lithium and beryllium that may have several possible compositions, including LiBe, LiBe2, Li2Be, LiBe3, Li3Be, Li2Be3, Li3Be2, LiBe4 and Li4Be. Computational methods indicate that some of these compositions may be superconductive under very high pressure and low temperature.

References

Hypothetical chemical compounds
Lithium compounds
Beryllium compounds